Jaime Rodrigo Rojas Gallardo (born 4 April 1973), also known as Jimmy Rojas, is a Chilean former professional footballer who played as a midfielder for clubs in Chile and Indonesia.

Career
A product of Universidad Católica youth system, Rojas made his professional debut with that club. He also played in Chile for Provincial Osorno.

In 1997, he went to Indonesia and joined PSM Makassar. He after played for PSMS Medan, Persema Malang (later Malang United), where he coincided with his compatriot Carlos Vega, Arema Malang and Persegi Bali.

After football
Rojas has spent time as a football agent of foreign players in the Indonesian football through his company Jima Sport. In addition, he started a football academy named Jima Sport Soccer Academy.

He has a motorcycle rental business called "Mr. Rental Bike" and a holiday home rental business.

He studies in Jakarta to become a football manager.

Personal life
Rojas made his home in Bali.

References

External links
 
 

1973 births
Living people
Footballers from Santiago
Chilean footballers
Chilean expatriate footballers
Club Deportivo Universidad Católica footballers
Provincial Osorno footballers
PSM Makassar players
PSMS Medan players
Persema Malang players
Arema F.C. players
Bali United F.C. players 
Chilean Primera División players
Indonesian Premier Division players
Chilean expatriate sportspeople in Indonesia
Expatriate footballers in Indonesia
Association football midfielders